Nistula Hebbar is an Indian journalist and author, currently working as the political editor at The Hindu. She previously worked for The Times of India, The Economic Times, and The Financial Express in New Delhi.

Early life 
She is from Mangalore and was born and brought up in Delhi. She studied Sociology at the Jesus and Mary College, University of Delhi and Delhi School of Economics.

Journalism 

Hebbar has been a journalist since 2000.

Works 
Nistula Hebbar wrote a book titled Kiss and Tell in 2012. She contributed to two books, Cabals and  Kings (edited by Aditi Phadnis) and The Lives of Muslims in India (edited by Abdul Shaban). In the latter, her essay deals with the Bharatiya Janata Party's engagement with Muslims.

References

Indian women editors
Indian editors
Indian newspaper editors
English-language writers from India
1975 births
Living people
The Hindu journalists
The Times of India journalists
Journalists from Delhi
Indian women novelists
21st-century Indian women writers
21st-century Indian novelists
21st-century Indian journalists
Women writers from Delhi
Novelists from Delhi
Women newspaper editors
Delhi University alumni